Caladenia intuta is a plant in the orchid family Orchidaceae and is endemic to two small areas on the Yorke Peninsula in South Australia. It is a ground orchid with a single hairy leaf and one or two white flowers which sometimes have faint reddish lines.

Description
The leaf and the flowering stem are densely covered with hairs. The sepals have thin blackish tips. The tip of the labellum curls downward and there are four rows of white or purplish calli shaped like hockey sticks along the mid-line of the labellum. Flowering occurs from August to September.

Taxonomy and naming
Caladenia intuta was first formally described in 2005 by David Jones, who gave it the name Arachnorchis intuta and published the description in The Orchadian from a specimen collected near Hardwicke Bay. It had previously been known as Caladenia sp. "Brentwood'. In 2008, Robert Bates changed the name to Caladenia intuta.

Distribution and habitat
This spider orchid is only known from two sites with a total population estimated in 2006 to be about 400 mature individuals growing in woodland.

Conservation
Caladenia intuta is classified as "Critically Endangered" under the Commonwealth Government Environment Protection and Biodiversity Conservation Act 1999 (EPBC) Act. The main threats to the species are weed invasion, grazing by sheep and vegetation clearance.

References

External links
 

intuta
Endemic orchids of Australia
Orchids of South Australia
Plants described in 2005
Taxa named by David L. Jones (botanist)
Taxa named by Robert John Bates